Gigi Masin (born October 24, 1955) is an Italian composer, ambient musician and producer from Venice. He is best known for his 1986 LP Wind and as a member of Gaussian Curve, a trio with Jonny Nash and Young Marco.

A member of Italy's underground electronic scene, Masin pressed Wind privately and only released it at a series of small concerts in 1986. Most of the remaining copies were destroyed when Masin's house was flooded. However, it became a cult item after being sampled by artists such as Björk and Nujabes, leading to a revival of interest in Masin's work. Music from Memory released the compilation Talk to the Sea in 2014, and the following year Masin reissued Wind on his own label The Bear on the Moon.

In the years since he released two albums (Clouds, in 2015 and The Distance, in 2017) with the newly formed trio Gaussian Curve, collaborated with Italian duo Tempelhof and released three solo albums and a number of singles and collaborative works.

Biography

Early life 
Despite his childhood dream of studying violin never becoming a reality, Masin's love for music did not subside. It soon evolved, first into playing the guitar and becoming a radio speaker and DJ, another childhood dream, when he was 18 years old. As a host of a public radio stations's late-night show, Masin could play long sets of very diverse music of his liking. After almost 10 years in this dream role, Masin found himself looking for a job as many public radio stations were closing down to changes in legislation. He first tried to make music of his own upon requests from friends working in theatre to use his vast collection of records and peculiar music for their productions. However, instead of playing the records in the “normal” way he would play them slower or backwards or record them on tape and add different noises on when playing the tapes back. It was during these late 1970s experimentations of sound collages made with tape loops, field recordings and turntablism that Masin discovered a new way to express his musical self which culminated in the release of his debut album Wind in 1987.

1986–1991 
Masin's first release Wind in 1986 (self-released and distributed for free) was a personal project originally conceived as a gift to give out at small local gigs and to friends.

Following up from this first solo release, the album Les Nouvelles Musiques Du Chambre for Sub Rosa came out in collaboration with This Heat's Charles Hayward. From this album, the track "Clouds" was sampled by Björk ("It's in Our Hands"), To Rococo Rot ("Die Dinge des Lebens"), Nujabes ("Latitude" and "Mystline"), The Black Eyed Peas and Post Malone ("Big Lie").

In 1991, he released the collaborative album The Wind Collector with Alessandro Monti on Marco Pandin's label Divergo (now Stella*Nera).

After this release, Masin shifted his focus from music creation to raise his family and working for Poste italiane.

2001–present 
After nearly a decade long hiatus, Masin reappeared on the scene with the solo album Lontano (2001) and the collaborative album Moltitudine in Labirinto (2003) with Giuseppe Caprioli, both on Giovanni Antognozzi's Ants Records.

In 2007 a flood in Venice destroyed nearly all of his work, tapes, records and musical equipment. The disappointment caused by this tragic event put Masin off creating music for a while until a friend requested a new album from him, which led Masin to buy a computer to make music, starting a new phase of innovation.

He recorded The Last DJ (2008) and Infanthree (2010) for the Italian netlabel Laverna, followed by a series of artistic video creations with visual artists such as the painter and designer Luis Filipe Cunha.

In a bid to save his past work Masin joined forces with Tiller and Tako Reyenga, heads of Dutch label Music From Memory, to release Talk to the Sea (2014), a retrospective compilation of his past work of 30 years.

It is through Music From Memory that Gigi met Jonny Nash, British producer and head of the label Melody As Truth, and Marco Sterk, Amsterdam-based Dutch producer and DJ also known under his other two monikers – Marco Solo and Young Marco; as the trio Gaussian Curve the three have released their debut album Clouds (2014) and The Distance (2017), both on Music From Memory.

Another successful collaboration struck in 2014, following a show in Mantua (Italy), with Luciano Ermondi and Paolo Mazzacani of the duo Tempelhof which resulted in two albums – Hoshi (2014) and Tsuki (2016) – two EP of remixes and two singles, all released on the Italian label Hell Yeah Recordings.

In 2016 came Stella, with Elia Perrone, founder of the releasing Italian label Unclear, and two releases on the label 13 – Venezia, a CD attached to the limited print book Il Silenzio Dei Tuoi Passi, a photographic collection depicting Gigi's hometown of Venezia at night time, by Stefano Gentile; and Playing Hazkará.

Two compilations on Suburbia Records, a sub-label of the Japanese DIW Products Group, came in 2017, followed by the self-released album Kite in 2018 and the collaborative album Postcards from Nowhere (2019) with Jonny Nash on Melody As Truth.

The latter includes six adapted pieces, originally recorded live in 2017 inside the French Pavilion of La Biennale in Venice, temporarily transformed into a recording studio by artist and frequent collaborator Xavier Veilhan; during their residency, the duo recorded original content from improvised compositions with Masin on the guitar and Nash on the piano, using different microphone techniques. London-based design and branding agency Commission Studio curated the art direction and photography of the LP, in collaboration with the photographer Luke Evans and Imprimerie du Marais, a Paris-based print atelier.

At the onset of the new decade Apollo – the ambient division of R & S Records – released Calypso, Masin's latest album.

Gigi has appeared on PAN as part of Lifted, a group spearheaded by Future Times founder Andrew Field-Pickering (Max D / Beautiful Swimmers), also featuring Matthew Papich (Co La), Jeremy Hyman (Avey Tare's Slasher Flicks), Motion Graphix, Jordan Czamanski (Juju & Jordash), and Dawit Eklund (1432 R). A series of singles came on Throne of Blood, Dekmantel, and Light in the Attic Records, along with dates at festivals, galleries, and opening for Oneohtrix Point Never and Devendra Banhart.

Discography

Albums

 Wind (1986)
 Les Nouvelles Musiques de Chambre, Vol. 2 (1989) (split with Charles Hayward)
 The Wind Collector (1991) (with Alessandro Monti)
 Lontano (2001)
 Moltitudine In Labirinto (2003) (With Giuseppe Caprioli)
 The Last DJ (2008)
 Hoshi (2014) (With Tempelhof)
 Clouds (2015) (with Gaussian Curve)
 Live at Superbudda (2015)
 Plays Hazkará (2016)
 Venezia 2016 (2016)
 Tsuzi (2016) (with Tempelhof)
 The Distance (2017) (with Gaussian Curve)
 KITE (2018)
 Postcards from Nowhere (2019) (With Jonny Nash)
 Calypso (2020)
 Vahiné (2022)

Singles and EPs

 Tuvalu (2015) (with Tempelhof)
 Hoshi (remixed) (2015) (with Tempelhof) 12”
 Stella (2016) (with Elia Perrone) 12”
 Tsuki (remixes) (2016) (with Tempelhof)
 Clouds (2016) 12”
 Cornersong (2018) (with Tempelhof) 12”
 Kite (2018) 7”
 Anemone (2019)

Compilations

Talk to the Sea (2014)
The Wind Collector / As Witness our Hands (2016) (with Alessandro Monti and Alessandro Pizzin)
Gigi Masin for Good Mellows (2017)

References

Living people
1955 births
Musicians from Venice